Rock Pony is an EP by Boston-based rock group The Lights Out.  Self-released in 2010, it contains four previously unreleased fixtures of the band’s live repertoire, and was recorded at the BU Center for Digital Imaging Arts in Waltham, MA, by Graeme Hall, Serge Espitia and Ryan Meyer. The album’s cover, featuring a centaur woman wielding a Gibson Les Paul, caused a stir.

Track listing
Back Down
Do Yourself a Favor
Seven Days
Make Me

Notes

2010 EPs
The Lights Out EPs